Vatero is a community of the city of Kozani in northern Greece. Located west of the city centre, it has a population of 738 (2011).

References

Kozani
Populated places in Kozani (regional unit)